Chengalvarayan Kuppusami (13 December 1926 – 19 April 2013) was a member of the Lok Sabha of India from 1998 to 2009. He represented the Chennai North constituency of Tamil Nadu and was a member of the Dravida Munnetra Kazhagam (DMK) political party.

He was a trade unionist and the president of the labour wing of the DMK political party.

References

External links
 Official biographical sketch in Parliament of India website
 Members of Fourteenth Lok Sabha - Parliament of India website

Indian Tamil people
Lok Sabha members from Tamil Nadu
1926 births
2013 deaths
India MPs 2004–2009
Dravida Munnetra Kazhagam politicians
India MPs 1998–1999
India MPs 1999–2004
People from Tiruvannamalai district
Politicians from Chennai